Hatim ibn al-Nu'man al-Bahili (Ḥātim ibn al-Nuʾmān al-Bāhilī) was an Arab tribal noble and commander under the Umayyad governor of Syria and later caliph Mu'awiya I.

Life
He thereafter settled in the Jazira (Upper Mesopotamia). During the First Muslim Civil War, he was among the  expelled from Iraq by Caliph Ali. Hatim fought on the side of Mu'awiya, the governor of Syria and Ali's chief opponent, at the Battle of Siffin in 657. Mu'awiya ultimately defeated Ali and founded the Umayyad Caliphate in 661. During his reign, in 665 or 666, Hatim was among the commanders dispatched to govern parts of Khurasan, the eastern frontier of the Caliphate, according to the 9th-century history of al-Tabari.

During the Second Muslim Civil War, he defected from the Umayyads, and joined their rivals, the Zubayrids, who held sway over Iraq and much of the Jazira. Under the Zubayrid governor of Mosul, Ibn al-Ashtar, Hatim served as the deputy governor of the Jaziran towns of Harran and Edessa.

His descendants, known as the 'Banu Hatim' after him, served as governors of the Jazira and the affiliated provinces of Armenia and Adharbayjan under the Umayyads and were active participants of the Qaysi faction against the Yaman, their rivals for power and influence in the Caliphate.

References

Bibliography

Bahila
People of the First Fitna
People of the Second Fitna